The Theban Legion (also known as the Martyrs of Agaunum) figures in Christian hagiography as a Roman legion from Egypt—"six thousand six hundred and sixty-six men"—who converted en masse to Christianity and were martyred together in 286, according to the hagiographies of Saint Maurice, the chief among the Legion's saints. Their feast day is held on September 22.

The account

According to Eucherius of Lyon, c. 443–450, the Legion was the garrison of the city of Thebes in Egypt. The Legion were quartered in the East until the emperor Maximian ordered them to march to Gaul, to assist him against the rebels of Burgundy. The Theban Legion was commanded in its march by Saint Maurice (Mauritius), Candidus, Innocent, and Exuperius, all of whom are venerated as saints. At Saint-Maurice, Switzerland, then called Agaunum, the orders were given—since the Legion had refused to sacrifice to the Emperor—to "decimate" it by putting to death a tenth of its men. This act was repeated twice before the entire legion was put to death.

According to a letter written about 450 by Eucherius, Bishop of Lyon, bodies identified as the martyrs of Agaunum were discovered by Theodore (Theodulus), the first historically identified Bishop of Octudurum, who was present at the Council of Aquileia, 381 and died in 391. The basilica he built in their honor attracted the pilgrim trade; its remains can still be seen, part of the abbey begun in the early sixth century on land donated by King Sigismund of Burgundy.

The earliest surviving document describing "the holy Martyrs who have made Agaunum illustrious with their blood" is the letter of Eucherius, which describes the succession of witnesses from the martyrdom to his time, a span of about 150 years. The bishop had made the journey to Agaunum himself, and his report of his visit multiplied a thousandfold the standard formula of the martyrologies:

We often hear, do we not, a particular locality or city is held in high honour because of one single martyr who died there, and quite rightly, because in each case the saint gave his precious soul to the most high God. How much more should this sacred place, Agaunum, be reverenced, where so many thousands of martyrs have been slain, with the sword, for the sake of Christ.

As with many hagiographies, Eucherius' letter to Bishop Salvius reinforced an existing pilgrimage site. Many of the faithful were coming from diverse provinces of the empire, according to Eucherius, devoutly to honor these saints, and (important for the abbey of Agaunum) to offer presents of gold, silver and other things. He mentions many miracles, such as casting out of devils and other kinds of healing "which the power of the Lord works there every day through the intercession of his saints."

In the late sixth century, Gregory of Tours was convinced of the miraculous powers of the Theban Legion, though he transferred the event to Cologne, where there was an early cult devoted to Maurice and the Theban Legion:

At Cologne there is a church in which the fifty men from the holy Theban Legion are said to have consummated their martyrdom for the name of Christ. And because the church, with its wonderful construction and mosaics, shines as if somehow gilded, the inhabitants prefer to call it the "Church of the Golden Saints". Once Eberigisilus, who was at the time bishop of Cologne, was racked with severe pains in half his head. He was then in a villa near a village. Eberigisilus sent his deacon to the church of the saints. Since there was said to be in the middle of the church a pit into which the saints were thrown together after their martyrdom, the deacon collected some dust there and brought it to the bishop. As soon as the dust touched Eberigisilus' head, immediately all pain was gone.

The tale of steadfast conduct and faith was embroidered in later retellings and figured in the Golden Legend of Jacobus de Voragine and was included among the persecution of Christians detailed in John Foxe's 1583 Actes and Monuments, an early Protestant stand-by.

Accounts of the moral inculcated by the exemplum of the Theban Legion resonate with the immediate culture of each teller. The miraculous whole-hearted unanimity of the Legion to the last individual, was downplayed by Hugo Grotius, for whom the moral of the Theban Legion was employed to condemn atrocities committed under military orders. For Donald O'Reilly, an apologist for the historicity of the account in 1978, it was "the moral issue of organized violence".

Interpretations
Thebaei is the proper name of one particular military unit, the Legio I Maximiana, also known as Maximiana Thebaeorum, recorded in the Notitia Dignitatum.

According to Samir F. Girgis, writing in the Coptic Encyclopedia, there were two legions bearing the name "Theban", both of them formed by Diocletian sometime after the organization of the original Egyptian legion, stationed at Alexandria. It is not certain which of these was transferred from Egypt to Europe in order to assist Maximian in Gaul.

The monastic accounts themselves do not specifically state that all the soldiers were collectively executed;  the twelfth century bishop Otto of Freising (probably influenced by Gregory of Tours' account) wrote in his Chronica de duabus civitatibus that many of the legionaries escaped and only some were executed at Agaunum, and the others apprehended later and put to death both at Bonn and Köln. It is possible that the legion was simply divided during Diocletian's re-organization of units (breaking up legions of 6000 men to create smaller units of 1000), and that some of the soldiers had been executed, and that this was where the story of the legion's destruction originated from. Henri Leclercq suggests that it is quite possible that an incident at Agaunum may have had to do not with a legion, but with a simple detachment.

Johan Mösch, after comparing information from the various chronicles on the events and geography of the martyrdoms of the legionaries, concluded that only a single cohort was martyred at Agaunum. The remainder of the cohorts (battalion sized units of which there were ten to a legion) were either on the march or already stationed along the Roman road that ran from Liguria through Turin and Milan, then across Alps and down the Rhine to Colonia Agrippinensis (Cologne).

L. Dupraz and Paul Müller, by examining the military titles and ranks of the legionnaires and thereby determining the total number of soldiers involved, estimated that the Thebans martyred at Agaunum consisted of but one cohort whose number did not exceed 520 men. Thus the execution of an entire cohors is equivalent to decimation of a legion.

Historicity
The account of the Theban legion is regarded as fictitious by many modern historians. Denis Van Berchem, of the University of Geneva, proposed that Eucherius' presentation of the legend of the Theban legion was a literary production, not based on a local tradition. David Woods, Professor of Classics at the University College Cork, alleges that the model of Maurice and the Theban Legion based on Eucherius of Lyon's letter was a complete fiction.

The strength of the account is based on the historical reputation for the first monks in the Christian tradition, the hermits of the Egyptian desert known as the "Desert Fathers", and the almost fanatical Christian following they inspired during the first two centuries. The most famous of the Desert Fathers was Anthony the Great. The persecution of high-ranking Christian nobility under Emperor Valerian following his edict in 258 and the purge of Christians from the military from 284 through 299 under Emperor Diocletian indicate that noncompliance with emperor worship was the common method for detecting Christian soldiers and eventually executing them.

Donald F. O'Reilly argues that evidence from coins, papyrus, and Roman army lists supports the story of the Theban Legion. A papyrus dated "in the sixth year of our Lord the Emperor Caesar Marcus Aurelius Probus Pius Augustus, Tubi sixteenth" (13 January 282 AD), shows rations which would sustain a legion for about three months to be delivered to Panopolis to the "mobilized soldiers and sailors". Coins from Alexandria from the same time period were minted in a style used only when troops for a new legion were leaving port. During the trial of the martyr Maximilian, it was noted that there were Christians serving in the Roman army, and the existence of Theban Christian legionaries in the same units as mentioned in the Notitia Dignitatum was shown.

Henri Leclercq also notes that the account of Eucherius "has many excellent qualities, historical as well as literary." L. Dupaz countered Denis Van Berchem's assertion by sifting through the stories, carefully matching them with archeological discoveries at Agaunum, thus concluding that the martyrdom is historical and that the relics of the martyrs were brought to Agaunum between 286 and 392 through the office of the bishop Theodore. Dom Ruinart, Paul Allard, and the editors of the "Analecta Bollandiana" are of opinion that "the martyrdom of the legion, attested, as it is by ancient and reliable evidence, cannot be called in question by any honest mind."

Saints associated with the Theban legion

Attilio
Maurice
Alexander of Bergamo
Bessus
Candidus
Cassius and Florentius
Chiaffredo (Theofredus)
Constantius
Defendens
Exuperius (Exupernis)
Felix and Regula, the patron saints of Zürich
Fidelis of Como
Fortunatus of Casei
Gereon
Magnus of Cuneo
Solutor, Octavius, and Adventor
Tegulus
Ursus of Solothurn
Victor of Xanten
Victor of Solothurn
Verena

Gallery

Further reading

References

External links

 Martyrs of the Theban Legion: in Switzerland at Agaunum, Solothurn, Zürich, Zurzach; in Italy at Bergamo, Turin, Piacenza, in the Cottian Alps, Pinerolo, Milian, Ventimilia; in Germany at Trier, Bonn, Cologne, Xanten

286 deaths
3rd-century Christian martyrs
Groups of Christian martyrs of the Roman era
History of Christianity in Switzerland
Legendary Romans
Martyred groups
Military saints
Saints from Roman Egypt
Year of birth unknown